A fluffy, also known as a furry leg warmer or furry boot cover, is a form of footwear fashion accessory. It is a form of leg warmer normally made out of faux fur that covers the user's main footwear. It is most normally associated with the rave scene and cybergoth fashion. Fluffies originated in the rave scene in mid-to-late 1990s Ibiza, where they worn by podium dancers during their performances.

References

External links

Footwear accessories
1990s fashion
2000s fashion
2010s fashion
Dancewear
Fashion accessories
Hosiery
Rave